Pina Gallini (19 March 1888 – 31 January 1974) was an Italian film actress. She appeared in 82 films between 1935 and 1963.

Selected filmography

 The Countess of Parma (1936)
 The Ferocious Saladin (1937)
 The Former Mattia Pascal (1937)
 Unjustified Absence (1939)
 The Document (1939)
 Mad Animals (1939)
 The Document (1939)
 Guest for One Night (1939)
 Heartbeat (1939)
 The Hussar Captain (1940)
 The Hero of Venice (1941)
 The Taming of the Shrew (1942)
 Four Steps in the Clouds (1942)
 Before the Postman (1942)
 Music on the Run (1943)
 Fatal Symphony (1947)
 The Emperor of Capri (1949)
 How I Discovered America (1949)
 The Elusive Twelve (1950)
 Rapture (1950)
 The Beggar's Daughter (1950)
 Toto the Third Man (1951)
 Toto and the Women (1952)
 The Daughter of the Regiment (1953)
 Days of Love (1954)
  Laugh! Laugh! Laugh! (1954)
 Noi siamo le colonne (1956)
 Serenata a Maria (1957)

References

External links

1888 births
1974 deaths
Italian film actresses
People from the Province of Ferrara
20th-century Italian actresses